Old Smokey is a euphemistic name given to the state prison electric chair in New Jersey, which is on display at the New Jersey State Police Museum. The chair's most notorious victim was Richard Hauptmann, the man behind the Lindbergh kidnapping.

It was also the name given to Pennsylvania's, as well as Tennessee‘s electric chair.

Executions
New Jersey's chair was used in the electrocution of 159 men between 1907 and 1963. The Pennsylvania electric chair was used in the electrocution of 348 men and two women between 1915 and 1962.

New Jersey abolished capital punishment in 2007, but had abandoned electrocution in favor of lethal injection in 1983. Pennsylvania abolished electrocution in favor of lethal injection in 1990.

See also
 Old Sparky, the nickname given to several states' electric chairs
 Gruesome Gertie, the nickname given to Louisiana's electric chair
 Yellow Mama, the nickname given to Alabama's electric chair

References

External links
 NJ State Police Museum
 The Newseum

1963 disestablishments
Electric chairs
Capital punishment in New Jersey